Agana Heights is one of the nineteen villages in the United States territory of Guam.  It is located in the hills south of Hagåtña (formerly Agana), in the central part of the island.  United States Naval Hospital Guam is located in this largely residential village.

Demographics
The U.S. Census Bureau has the municipality in multiple census-designated places: Agana Heights, and U.S. Naval Hospital.

Education

The village is served by the Guam Public School System Agana Heights Elementary School is in Agana Heights. Jose Rios Middle School in Piti serves sections of Agana Heights south of Tutujan Drive. George Washington High School in Mangilao serves the village. In addition, Department of Defense Education Activity operates Guam High School in Agana Heights.
The Guam Adventist Academy was located in the village until it moved into its current Yona campus, which the institution secured in 1963.

Notable residents
Joseph George Bamba – newcomer of CCU Vice-Chair and former chief of staff to Gov. Paul McDonald Calvo and Felix Camacho.
Carl Gutierrez – former Governor of Guam (1995–2003)
Geri Gutierrez – former First Lady of Guam (1995–2003)
Sean Reid-Foley – MLB pitcher for the New York Mets
Senator Rory J. Respicio – former Democratic Party of Guam Chairman

Government

See also 
 Villages of Guam

References

 
Census-designated places in Guam